Bulguk may refer to:

 Bulguk-dong (Bulguk district in Korea)
 Bulguksa (Bulguk temple in Korea)